Dougald MacPherson (October 23, 1882 – May 28, 1964) was a Canadian politician. He served in the Legislative Assembly of British Columbia from 1925 to 1928 and from 1933 to 1937 for the electoral district of Grand Forks-Greenwood, a member of the Liberal party.

References

1882 births
1964 deaths